Svastra is a genus of long-horned bees in the family Apidae. There are at least 20 described species in Svastra.

Species
These 23 species belong to the genus Svastra:

References

Further reading

External links

 

Apinae